George Wolfe may refer to:

George C. Wolfe (born 1954), African-American playwright and director
George Wolfe (Irish politician) (1860–1941), Irish Cumann na nGaedhael TD 1923–1932
George Wolfe (CPA), US government administrator in Iraq
George Wolfe (cartoonist) (1911–1993), American cartoonist

See also
George Wolf (1777–1840), governor of the U.S. state of Pennsylvania
George Wolff (disambiguation)